Gonzalo Aguilar Camacho (born 2 August 1987) is a Uruguayan footballer who plays as a defender for Racing Club in the Uruguayan Segunda División.

Career statistics

Club

References

External links
Gonzalo Aguilar at playmakerstats.com (English version of ogol.com.br)

1987 births
Living people
Racing Club de Montevideo players
Uruguayan Primera División players
Uruguayan Segunda División players
Uruguayan footballers
Association football defenders